Dental Students' Scientific Association of Egypt is a non-governmental organization that aims mainly to promote public awareness of oral and dental health among Egyptian society, and to improve the scientific knowledge and soft skills of Egyptian and non-Egyptian dental students all over Arab Republic of Egypt.

History 
In September 1969, group of students from Alexandria Faculty of Dentistry with Prof. Dr. Mahmoud Elhadary (dean of faculty at that time) traveled to Prague (capital of Czechoslovakia Republic at that time) to attend the annual meeting of the International Association of Dental Students.

They were impressed by activities and projects which are organized by IADS and its national and local member organizations worldwide, so they decided to bring this idea to their home country.

Later 1970, Dental Students' Scientific Association of Egypt was officially established and recognized by its headquarters university (Alexandria University). Then two years later, the International Association of Dental Students has accepted the application for Full Country Membership of DSSA-Egypt.

In 2005, Faculty of Dentistry – Tanta University has decided to join this national association which represents Egyptian dental students globally. By the next year, Tanta Scientific Association of Dental Students (TSADS) won the Full Local Membership in DSSA-Egypt to be the second Local member after Alexandria.

Membership 
The membership of Dental Students' Scientific Association of Egypt is divided up into two main categories:
 Local Organization Membership, which maybe Full Membership or Corresponding Membership.
 Individual Membership, like Honorary Life Membership and Supporting Membership.
Below is the list of Local Organization Membership

See also 
 Egyptian Pharmaceutical Students Federation (EPSF)
 FDI World Dental Federation
 International Association of Dental Students (IADS)
 International Federation of Medical Students Associations (IFMSA)

References 

Dental organizations
Dentistry education
Medical and health organisations based in Egypt
Medical and health student organizations
Student organizations established in 1970
Student organisations in Egypt
1970 establishments in Egypt